Comedy Central is an Australian and New Zealand 24-hour linear subscription television channel dedicated to comedy programming owned by Paramount Global, launched on April Fool's Day 2009 in New Zealand and on 1 April 2016 in Australia. The channel is exclusively available via Australian IPTV provider Fetch TV in Australia and is broadcast on the Sky TV platform in New Zealand. It was one of the first Comedy Central franchises to be launched outside the United States. The channel has a strong blend of animation, stand-up and scripted programs. The core audience demographic covers the 15–48 age bracket. It features well known international titles, as well as some local content. It has strong viewership and is one of the top entertainment channels on the Sky TV platform.

History
On 29 February 2016, it was announced that following discussions since mid 2015, Fetch TV had finalised discussions with Viacom on Friday 26 February 2016 to launch Comedy Central. The launch comes following increased local presence by Comedy Central. The channel, which will be advertisement free and be exclusively available via Fetch TV, will be broadcast from Australia and as a result see Viacom hire additional local personnel for operations. The launch of Comedy Central coincided with the initial closure of sister channel MTV Classic prior to its eventual rebrand.

Comedy Central programming is also available across Australia via the SVOD service Paramount+, which replaced 10 All Access on August 11, 2021.

Programming
The network airs content from its U.S. counterpart, with 90% of the programming at launch coming from the ViacomCBS library, in addition to local productions - which initially is in short form. Although Viacom have existing agreements with the Foxtel-owned The Comedy Channel, content is made available to both Comedy Central and The Comedy Channel at the same time.

Original programming
 Trendy
These New South Whales
The Mike Nolan Show

Acquired programming
Some programmes available include:

@midnight
Another Period
 Adam Devine's House Party
American Dad!
Are You Being Served
Beavis and Butt-head
Balls of Steel
The Benny Hill Show
The Big Bang Theory
The Billy T James Show
The Black Adder
Broad City
Bob's Burgers
Bottom
bro' Town  
Chappelle's Show
Comedy Central Roast 
The Cleveland Show
The Daily Show with Trevor Noah
Drawn Together
Drew Carey's Improv-A-Ganza
Drunk History
Family Guy
Facejacker
Fonejacker
Friday Night Dinner 
Friends
Futurama
The Half Hour
Hogan's Heroes
How I Met Your Mother
Idiotsitter 
The Inbetweeners
Inside Amy Schumer
Impractical Jokers
Key & Peele 
Live at the Apollo
M*A*S*H
The Middle
Mr. Black
My Name Is Earl
Nathan for You
The Nightly Show with Larry Wilmore
Not Safe with Nikki Glaser
The Office
On The Buses
Only Fools and Horses
Regular Old Bogan
Rick and Morty (Season 1-2)
Robot Chicken
Rude Tube 
Russell Howard's Good News
Saturday Night Live
The Simpsons
Some Mothers Do 'Ave 'Em
South Park (shared with FOX8)
Studio C
Superstore 
Swift and Shift Couriers
Two and a Half Men
Tosh.0
Workaholics

References

External links

Television channels and stations established in 2009
Television channels and stations established in 2016
English-language television stations in Australia
English-language television stations in New Zealand
Television channels in New Zealand
Comedy Central
2009 establishments in New Zealand
2016 establishments in Australia